Elias Saad (born 27 December 1999) is a German football and futsal player who plays as an attacker for  club St. Pauli.

Career
From Wilhelmsburg, Hamburg, in 2017 Saad played under-19 football for Buxtehuder SV. After this he played for HSV Barmbek-Uhlenhorst, playing 29 games in which he scored eleven goals and was credited with seven assists. Whilst playing amateur football in Hamburg Saad also trained as a wholesale and retail salesman. Till 2021 Saad played for the Futsal-Bundesliga Team HSV-Panthers (futsal team which belongs to the Hamburger SV). In March 2021 Saad agreed to join Regionalliga Nord side FC Eintracht Norderstedt 03, signing a two year contract. On 1 December 2022, Saad was announced as signing for 2. Bundesliga side St. Pauli.

References

 
1999 births
Footballers from Hamburg
German footballers
German men's futsal players
Living people
FC Eintracht Norderstedt 03 players
FC St. Pauli players
Landesliga players
Oberliga (football) players
Regionalliga players